Carlos Ruiz (born 6 October 1940) is a Salvadoran sailor. He competed in the Finn event at the 1968 Summer Olympics.

References

External links
 

1940 births
Living people
Salvadoran male sailors (sport)
Olympic sailors of El Salvador
Sailors at the 1968 Summer Olympics – Finn
Sportspeople from San Salvador